Crampfish may refer to any of these species of fish that can deliver electric shocks:

Coffin ray, Hypnos monopterygius
Atlantic torpedo, Torpedo nobiliana
Common torpedo, Torpedo torpedo